Vonn is a surname. Notable people with the surname include:

Eric Vonn, Guatemalan screenwriter
Lindsey Vonn (born 1984), American alpine skier
Thomas Vonn (born 1975), American alpine skier, ex-husband of Lindsey Vonn

See also
Von (disambiguation)
Vorn